Calendar is a 2018 Indian Assamese-language drama film directed by Himjyoti Talukdar under the banner of Enajori Talkies. The film stars Moloya Goswami, Arun Nath, Gunjan Bhardwaj and Rimjhim Deka. The movie was released on 16 February 2018 in theatres across Assam. The film has received good word of mouth publicity and the footfall has been increasing since its release. Many people have expressed in social media how this film made them emotional about their relationship with the family especially old parents. The film received the maximum number of seven awards in Prag Cine Awards North East 2018 in various categories. Lead actor Arun Nath won the Jury Special Award in the 2nd Guwahati International Film Festival for his performance in the film.

Cast

 Moloya Goswami as Manorama Kakati
 Arun Nath as Hitesh Kakati
 Gunjan Bhardwaj as Arunabh
 Rimjhim Deka as Fatema

Synopsis 
Hitesh Kakati is a retired teacher who lives with his wife Manorama Kakati happily in a small town. Their son, newly married Arunav, stays in Delhi with his non-Assamese wife. Both the son and daughter-in-law are dear to Hitesh and Manorama Kakati, and they too love their parents. But, the situation gradually changes when Arunav comes home during Magh Bihu and tells Manorama, a major problem which he is facing in his professional life. Manorama becomes tensed after knowing Arunav's crisis and plans to help him in her own way. On the other hand, Manorama records her monthly activities in a calendar gifted by Kakati on New Year. She marks every event in that particular calendar with a circle mentioning the event name. But she marks a few dates with circles without mentioning anything, which then leads to the exploring of a different tale, devastating Hitesh Kakati.

Production and development

The film was shot in beautiful locations in Dergaon, Golaghat and Jakhalabandha of Assam. The film teaser was launched on 27 February 2017. The film received CBFC Certificate on December 13, 2017 and released on 16 February 2018.

Music

Score
Background score of the film is composed by Tarali Sarma who also provided music for three tracks on the film's soundtrack album.

Soundtrack
The soundtrack is composed by Tarali Sarma and features playback singer Siddharth Hazarika.

Lyrics
Two songs of the film is penned down by Tarali Sarma and one song is written by Santanu Rowmuria.

Track listing

Awards

At Prag Cine Awards 2018
 Best Actor (Male) : Arun Nath
 Best Debut Director : Himjyoti Talukdar
 Best Supporting Actor (Female) : Rimjhim Deka 
 Best Screenplay : Himjyoti Talukdar, Santanu Rowmuria, Jhulan Krishna Mahanta
 Best Lyrics : Tarali Sarma
 Best Singer (Male) : Siddharth Hazarika
 Best Art Direction : Kalpana Borah

At 2nd Guwahati International Film Festival 2018
 Jury Special Award : Arun Nath

Official selection at festivals

9th Jagran Film Festival 2018
Habitat Film Festival 2018
Pondicherry International Film Festival 2018
2nd Guwahati International Film Festival 2018

References

External links
 Official Website
 

2018 films
2010s Assamese-language films